The 2020 Ladbrokes Masters was the eighth staging of the non-ranking Masters darts tournament, held by the Professional Darts Corporation (PDC). It was held from 31 January–2 February 2020 at the Marshall Arena in Milton Keynes, England.

Michael van Gerwen was the five-time defending champion, after defeating James Wade 11–5 in the 2019 final. However, he was beaten in the Masters for the first time since 2014, losing 10–6 to Jonny Clayton in the first round, and losing his 20-match unbeaten streak at the Marshall Arena.

Peter Wright won the tournament for the first time and extended his unbeaten streak in all competitions to 10 matches. He beat Michael Smith 11–10 in the final, with Smith missing 3 darts to win the title himself.

Qualifiers
The Masters featured the top 16 players in the PDC Order of Merit after the 2020 PDC World Darts Championship. Nathan Aspinall made his debut in the event.

The following 16 players took part in the tournament:

 Michael van Gerwen (first round)
 Peter Wright (winner)
 Gerwyn Price (quarter-finals)
 Rob Cross (first round)
 Michael Smith (runner-up)
 Gary Anderson (semi-finals)
 Daryl Gurney (first round)
 Nathan Aspinall (semi-finals)
 James Wade (first round)
 Dave Chisnall (quarter-finals)
 Ian White (first round)
 Mensur Suljović (first round)
 Adrian Lewis (quarter-finals)
 Simon Whitlock (first round)
 Joe Cullen (first round)
 Jonny Clayton (quarter-finals)

Prize money
The prize money was £200,000 in total, which was the same as in 2019.

Draw

References

Masters
Masters (darts)
Masters (darts)
Masters (darts)
Masters (darts)
Sport in Milton Keynes
2020s in Buckinghamshire